Kurwa may refer to:

 a Polish profanity
 Kurwa railway station, Dumka district, India
 Kurwa, a 2015 music album by Schwesta Ewa
 a village in Araria district, Bihar, India
 a village in Siwan district, Bihar, India
 a village in Borno State, Nigeria

See also 
 Curva
 Kurwai
 Kurwar

Polish profanity